North is a 1994 American comedy-drama adventure film directed by Rob Reiner. The story is based on the 1984 novel North: The Tale of a 9-Year-Old Boy Who Becomes a Free Agent and Travels the World in Search of the Perfect Parents by Alan Zweibel, who wrote the screenplay and has a minor role in the film. The cast includes Elijah Wood in the title role, with Jon Lovitz, Jason Alexander, Alan Arkin, Dan Aykroyd, Kathy Bates, Faith Ford, Graham Greene, Julia Louis-Dreyfus, Reba McEntire, John Ritter, and Abe Vigoda. Bruce Willis narrates and plays several different roles throughout the film, and a 9-year-old Scarlett Johansson appears briefly in her film debut. This was the final theatrical film for Alexander Godunov before his death the following year. The film was shot in Hawaii, Alaska, California, South Dakota, New Jersey, and New York. It was a box office bomb, grossing just $12 million against its $40 million budget, and received largely negative reviews from critics, many of whom called it one of the worst films ever made.

Plot 

Skilled in academics, sports, and drama, and praised for his good work and obedience, North feels unvalued by his own parents. One day, while finding solace in a living room display at a mall, he complains to the Easter Bunny—a man in a pink bunny suit—who recommends that North simply explain his feelings to them, but North says their neglect makes them undeserving. Aided and encouraged by his best friend Winchell, who works on the school paper, North plots to "divorce" his parents, hiring ambulance-chasing lawyer Arthur Belt to file the papers. The announcement greatly shocks his parents, leaving them unresponsive when Judge Buckle grants his petition, giving him one summer to find new parents or go to an orphanage.

North's first stop is Texas, where his parental candidates, Ma and Pa Tex, promise to use their wealth to fulfill North's desires. In a musical number (set to the Bonanza theme), they explain that their first son, Buck, died in a stampede and they plan to use North to replace Buck, planning out his entire life in advance, including his future wife. They also place massive quantities of food on his dinner plate, hoping that he will eat as much as Buck did (as Pa Tex had earlier mentioned Buck's obesity to North, saying "he could eat more in one day than anyone else could eat in a whole month"). Gabby, a sharpshooting cowboy (also the man in the Easter Bunny suit), presents North with a souvenir from his act—a silver dollar with a bullet hole shot through its center—and notes that North is unhappy with the Texes because he wishes to be appreciated for who he is, not made into someone else, advising him to move on.

His next stop is Hawaii, where Governor and Mrs. Ho, who cannot have biological children, are eager to adopt him. Believing that North's presence in Hawaii will attract mainlanders, the governor unveils a tourism campaign that references the classic Coppertone ad by showcasing North's bare buttocks, horrifying him. On the beach, a tourist with a metal detector (also the man in the bunny suit) explains to North that parents should not use children for personal gain.

In an Inuit village in Alaska, North's prospective parents calmly send their elderly grandfather out to sea on an ice floe to die with dignity, disturbing him. As the long, dark winter arrives, he realizes that his summer is almost up. Meanwhile, his now-catatonic real parents are put in a museum display. His quest has inspired children worldwide to leave their parents and hire Belt and Winchell, both now rich and powerful. North's next family is Amish, but the lack of conveniences quickly disappoints him. His experiences in Zaire, China, and Paris are equally fruitless. Finally, he finds the Nelsons, an ideal family who give him attention and appreciation, but he still is unsatisfied.

In despair, North escapes to New York City, where Winchell and Belt, fearing their lucrative business will fail, plot to assassinate him. On the run, he receives a videotape from his newly revived parents begging for his forgiveness and his return home. Standup comedian Joey Fingers (the same man in the bunny suit) encourages him. At the airport, a mob of kids who have followed his example confront him, angry about his returning to his parents, forcing him to ship himself home in a FedEx box. Recognizing the delivery driver from his other appearances, North asks if he is his guardian angel. The man denies meeting North, but as a FedEx representative, he resembles a guardian of important items.

North is delivered to his house prior to the deadline, but as he runs toward his parents, an assassin takes aim. As he squeezes the trigger, North awakens in the now-empty mall. The Easter Bunny takes him home, where his parents, who have been worried during his absence, greet him warmly. It has all been a dream, but in his pocket, North discovers Gabby's silver dollar. North says he has always had it, "for good luck", and goes inside as his parents agree to bring him dinner in bed.

Cast 

 Elijah Wood as North
 Bruce Willis as Narrator and benevolent advisors (Easter Bunny, Gabby, Tourist, Sleigh Driver, Joey Fingers, FedEx Driver)
 Jon Lovitz as Arthur Belt
 Matthew McCurley as Winchell
 Jason Alexander as North's Father
 Julia Louis-Dreyfus as North's Mother
 Alan Arkin as Judge Buckle
 Dan Aykroyd as Pa Tex
 Reba McEntire as Ma Tex
 Alexander Godunov as Amish Father 
 Kelly McGillis as Amish Mother
 Graham Greene as Alaskan Father
 Kathy Bates as Alaskan Mother
 Abe Vigoda as Alaskan Grandfather
 Faith Ford as Donna Nelson
 John Ritter as Ward Nelson
 Scarlett Johansson as Laura Nelson
 Jesse Ziegler as Bud Nelson
 Keone Young as Governor Ho
 Lauren Tom as Mrs. Ho
 Ben Stein as Museum Curator
 Taylor Fry as Zoe
 Alana Austin as Hannah
 Jussie Smollett as Adam
 Robert Costanzo as Al
 Rosalind Chao as Chinese Mother
 Alan Rachins as Defense Attorney
 Richard Belzer as Barker
 Marc Shaiman as Piano Player
 Alan Zweibel as Baseball Coach

Production
Elijah Wood was cast as the lead in 1993. The movie was shot in New York with additional shooting in Los Angeles, Hawaii, and Alaska (Prince William Sound and several glaciers). John Candy was initially cast as Pa Tex before dropping out and being replaced by Dan Aykroyd.

Reception 
North has been called one of the worst films ever made. On review aggregator site Rotten Tomatoes, North received a rating of 14% based on 35 reviews, with an average rating of 3.8/10. The site's critics' consensus reads, "Laden with schmaltz and largely bereft of evident narrative purpose, North represents an early major disappointment from previously sure-handed director Rob Reiner." Audiences surveyed by CinemaScore gave the film a grade "B−" on scale of A to F.

Kenneth Turan stated in his review "The problem overall is not so much that the humor, especially in the parent-tryout situations, is forced, but that it simply is not there at all. So little is going on in this mildest of fantasies that it is hard to even guess what kinds of emotional effects were aimed at in the first place." Turan also asked "How could director Rob Reiner, whose touch for what pleases a mass audience is usually unfailing, have strayed this far?" Leonard Klady of Variety described the film as a "noble misfire" and "that unique breed of misconceived entertainment that only a filmmaker of talent is capable of making." Joe Brown of The Washington Post called the film "a gentle, harmless and rather pedestrian fantasy." Janet Maslin of The New York Times was somewhat more positive, writing that the film "doesn't always work, but much of it is clever in amusingly unpredictable ways."

North was a multiple nominee at the 15th Golden Raspberry Awards in six categories including Worst Picture and Worst Director for Rob Reiner.

In an interview with Archive of American Television, Reiner defended the film, saying:

Siskel & Ebert's reviews 

Film critic Roger Ebert of The Chicago Sun-Times seemed especially baffled by North, describing Reiner as "a gifted filmmaker" and Wood as "a talented young actor", yet North was "one of the worst movies ever made." Ebert stressed that he "hated this movie" and also suggested the film was so poorly written that even the best child actor would look bad in it, and viewed it as "some sort of lapse" on Reiner's part. Ebert awarded North a rare zero-star rating.

Comedian Richard Belzer, who appeared in North, goaded Reiner into reading aloud some of the review at Reiner's roast; Reiner jokingly insisted that "if you read between the lines, [the review] isn't really that bad." An abridged version of the remark quoted above became the title of a 2000 book by Ebert, I Hated, Hated, Hated This Movie, a compilation of reviews of films most disliked by Ebert.

Writer Alan Zweibel described the review as "[E]mbarrassing. And hurtful", and stated it was repeatedly quoted to him, his wife, and his son (who had inspired the book North). In an encounter with Ebert years later, Zweibel jokingly said "And I just have to tell you, Roger, that that sweater you're wearing? I hate, hate, hate, hate, hate that sweater." He also keeps a clipping of it in his wallet, which he reads at public events.

Ebert and his co-host on Siskel and Ebert, Gene Siskel, both pronounced it the worst film of 1994, an opinion they each came to independently.  In their original review, Ebert called it "one of the most thoroughly hateful movies in recent years. A movie that makes me cringe even when I'm sitting here thinking about it." He later added, "I hated this movie as much as any movie we have ever reviewed in the 19 years we've been doing this show. I hated it because of the premise, which seems shockingly cold-hearted, and because this premise is being suggested to kids as children's entertainment, and because everybody in the movie was vulgar and stupid, and because the jokes weren't funny, and because most of the characters were obnoxious, and because of the phony attempt to add a little pseudo-hip philosophy with the Bruce Willis character." Siskel added, "I think you gotta hold Rob Reiner's feet to the fire here. I mean, he's the guy in charge . . . he's saying this is entertainment . . . it's deplorable. There isn't a gag that works. You couldn't write worse jokes if I told you to write worse jokes. The ethnic stereotyping is appalling . . . it's embarrassing . . .  you feel unclean as you're sitting there. It's junk. First-class junk!" and finished his statement with "Any subject could be done well; this is just trash, Roger." Ebert's future co-host on Ebert and Roeper, Richard Roeper, would later go on to list North as one of the 40 worst movies he's ever seen, stating: "Of all the films on this list, North may be the most difficult to watch from start to finish. I've tried twice and failed. Do yourself a favor and don't even bother. Life is too short."

Box office
The film grossed only $7 million in the United States and Canada and $12.2 million worldwide, making it one of the worst-performing films of the year given its large budget.

Year-end lists 
 #1 Worst – Roger Ebert, Chicago Sun-Times
 #1 Worst – Gene Siskel, Chicago Tribune
 Top 10 worst (alphabetical order, not ranked) – William Arnold, Seattle Post-Intelligencer
 Top 10 worst (not ranked) – Betsy Pickle, Knoxville News-Sentinel
 Dishonorable mention – Glenn Lovell, San Jose Mercury News
 Dishonorable mention – Dan Craft, The Pantagraph

Awards and nominations

See also 
 List of films considered the worst

References

External links 

 
 
 
 

 

1994 films
1990s adventure comedy-drama films
1990s children's adventure films
1990s children's fantasy films
1990s fantasy comedy-drama films
American adventure comedy-drama films
American children's adventure films
American children's fantasy films
American fantasy comedy-drama films
Castle Rock Entertainment films
Children's comedy-drama films
Columbia Pictures films
1990s English-language films
Films scored by Marc Shaiman
Films about dreams
Films about dysfunctional families
Films based on American novels
Films based on fantasy novels
Films directed by Rob Reiner
Films set in Africa
Films set in Alaska
Films set in China
Films set in Hawaii
Films set in New York City
Films set in Paris
Films set in Texas
Films shot in Alaska
Films shot in California
Films shot in Hawaii
Films shot in South Dakota
Films shot in New Jersey
Films shot in New York (state)
New Line Cinema films
Films with screenplays by Alan Zweibel
1994 comedy films
1994 drama films
Easter Bunny in film
Stereotypes of Inuit people
1990s American films